John Caven (c. 1833 – April 8, 1898) was an Ontario farmer and political figure. He represented Prince Edward in the Legislative Assembly of Ontario as a Liberal-Patrons of Industry member from 1894 to 1898.

He was born in Picton and educated in Marysburgh. Caven served on the council for Prince Edward County and was a public school trustee.

External links 
The Canadian parliamentary companion, 1897 JA Gemmill

1833 births
1898 deaths
Ontario Patrons of Industry MPPs
People from Prince Edward County, Ontario